Gymnopilus olivaceobrunneus is a species of mushroom in the family Hymenogastraceae.

See also

List of Gymnopilus species

External links
Gymnopilus olivaceobrunneus at Index Fungorum

olivaceobrunneus
Fungi of North America